Ghorawadi railway station is a railway station on Pune Suburban Railway line. 
All local trains between Pune Junction–, Pune Junction–Talegaon, –Lonavala, Shivajinagar–Talegaon stop here.

Pune Junction– Passenger also stops here.

Nearest areas are Ghorawadi, Talegaon Dabhade.

It is the only railway station in India where platforms are not parallel to each other; it is a step formation.

References

Pune Suburban Railway
Pune railway division
Railway stations in Pune district